Kubeflow is an open-source platform for machine learning and MLOps on Kubernetes introduced by Google. The different stages in a typical machine learning lifecycle are represented with different software components in Kubeflow, including model development (Kubeflow Notebooks), model training (Kubeflow Pipelines, Kubeflow Training Operator), model serving (KServe), and automated machine learning (Katib).

Each component of Kubeflow can be deployed separately, and it is not a requirement to deploy every component.

History 

The Kubeflow project was first announced at KubeCon + CloudNativeCon North America 2017 by Google engineers David Aronchick, Jeremy Lewi, and Vishnu Kannan to address a perceived lack of flexible options for building production-ready machine learning systems. The project has also stated it began as a way for Google to open-source how they ran TensorFlow internally.

The first release of Kubeflow (Kubeflow 0.1) was announced at KubeCon + CloudNativeCon Europe 2018 with claims of having already become among the top 2% of GitHub projects ever. Kubeflow 1.0 was released in March 2020 via a public blog post announcing that many Kubeflow components were graduating to a "stable status", indicating they were now ready for production usage.

Components

Kubeflow Notebooks for model development 

Machine learning models are developed in the notebooks component called Kubeflow Notebooks. The component runs web-based development environments inside a Kubernetes cluster, with native support for Jupyter Notebook, Visual Studio Code, and RStudio.

Kubeflow Pipelines for model training 

Once developed, models are trained in the Kubeflow Pipelines component. The component acts as a platform for building and deploying portable, scalable machine learning workflows based on Docker containers. Google Cloud Platform has adopted the Kubeflow Pipelines DSL within its Vertex AI Pipelines product.

Kubeflow Training Operator for model training 

For certain machine learning models and libraries, the Kubeflow Training Operator component provides Kubernetes custom resources support. The component runs distributed or non-distributed TensorFlow, PyTorch, Apache MXNet, XGBoost, and MPI training jobs on Kubernetes.

KServe for model serving 

The KServe component (previously named KFServing) provides Kubernetes custom resources for serving machine learning models on arbitrary frameworks including TensorFlow, XGBoost, scikit-learn, PyTorch, and ONNX. KServe was developed collaboratively by Google, IBM, Bloomberg, NVIDIA, and Seldon. Publicly disclosed adopters of KServe include Bloomberg, Gojek, and others.

Katib for automated machine learning 

Lastly, Kubeflow includes a component for automated training and development of machine learning models, the Katib component. It is described as a Kubernetes-native project and features hyperparameter tuning, early stopping, and neural architecture search.

Release timeline

Notes

References

External links
 
 

2018 software
Cloud infrastructure
Data mining and machine learning software
Software using the Apache license
Free software programmed in Python
Free software programmed in Go